From March 10 to May 19, 1936, voters of the Democratic Party chose its nominee for president in the 1936 United States presidential election. Incumbent President Franklin D. Roosevelt was selected as the nominee through a series of primary elections and caucuses culminating in the 1936 Democratic National Convention held from June 23 to June 27, 1936, in Philadelphia, Pennsylvania.

Candidates 
Before his assassination, there was a challenge from Louisiana Senator Huey Long. But, due to his untimely assassination, President Roosevelt faced only one primary opponent other than various favorite sons.

Primaries

See also 
 Republican Party presidential primaries, 1936
White primary

References